Carl H. Conrads  (February 26, 1839 in Breisig, Germany – May 24, 1920 in Hartford, Connecticut) was an American sculptor best known for his work on Civil War monuments and his two works in the National Statuary Hall Collection at the U.S. Capitol in Washington, D.C. He was also known as Charles Conrads.

Biography
He was born in Sinzig-on-the-Rhine, the son of Heinrich Joseph Conrads and Johanna Maria Catherina Fleischer. His father was mayor of their town until removed from office by the Prussians in 1850. In 1853 his parents and brother Robert emigrated to Texas, where they became farmers and furnituremakers. Carl remained in Munich and received a diploma from the Koeniglich Bayerische Akademie der Bildenden Kunste. He emigrated to New York in 1860, and served as an artilleryman in the 20th New York Volunteers during the American Civil War. He moved to Hartford, Connecticut in 1866 to work for James G. Batterson at the New England Granite Works, where he worked until 1903.

A reference from 1879:

Another German artist, Carl Conrads, has been for twelve years connected with the Hartford Granite Company [sic]. He is perhaps over-modest regarding his work as a sculptor, which is surely very good of its kind. Among his best designs are the figures on the Antietam Monument. In 1871 he returned to Munich for a short visit, availing himself of the opportunity for still further study. As a designer of monuments, his work stands high.

Sculptor and sculpture historian Lorado Taft said of him: "a German of good training, has identified himself with sculpture in granite, and has done much creditable work well adapted to the requirements of that ungrateful material."

Noteworthy among his granite works are his colossal American Volunteer statue at Antietam National Cemetery in Sharpsburg, Maryland; his seated figure of Morality on the National Monument to the Forefathers in Plymouth, Massachusetts – "said to be the largest solid granite monument in the world;" and his Alexander Hamilton statue in Central Park, New York City.

Conrads is buried in West Hartford, Connecticut; his grave is marked with a simple stone.

Selected works

 Oswin Welles Memorial, bronze figure, Cedar Hill Cemetery, Hartford, Connecticut, 1873.
 Bust of Laurent Clerc, American School for the Deaf, West Hartford, Connecticut, 1874. The pedestal features a frieze of Clerc's name spelled in sign language. 
 Moorhead Column, Allegheny Cemetery, Pittsburgh, Pennsylvania, 1877.
 Alexander Hamilton,  Central Park, New York City, 1880. Conrads's plaster model for this is at the Museum of American Finance in New York City.
 Joel Thayer Monument, granite, Lake View Cemetery, Skaneateles, New York, 1882–83, George Keller, architect.
 Colonel Sylvanus Thayer Monument ("Father of the Military Academy"), U.S. Military Academy, West Point, New York, 1883.
 Relief bust of Noah Webster, Connecticut State Capitol, Hartford, Connecticut, 1885.
 Relief bust of Reverend Horace Bushnell, Connecticut State Capitol, Hartford, Connecticut, circa 1885.
 General Henry W. Halleck, Golden Gate Park, San Francisco, California, 1886.
 National Monument to the Forefathers, Plymouth, Massachusetts, 1889. With sculptors William Rimmer, John D. Perry (attributed), Alexander Doyle and James H. Mahoney; and architects Hammatt Billings and Joseph Edward Billings.
 Morality (seated figure), granite.
 Embarkation at Delft Haven (bas-relief plaque), marble.
 General John Stark, bronze, New Hampshire Statehouse, Concord, New Hampshire, 1890, John A. Fox, architect. 
 John B. Ford, bronze, Third Street Park, Ford City, Pennsylvania, 1891.
 John Stark from New Hampshire, marble, National Statuary Hall Collection, United States Capitol, Washington D.C., 1894. Currently residing in the United States Capitol crypt. 
 Daniel Webster from New Hampshire (after Thomas Ball), marble, National Statuary Hall Collection, United States Capitol, Washington D.C., 1894.
 Samuel J. Tilden Monument, Cemetery of the Evergreens, New Lebanon, New York,  1895, Ernest Flagg, architect.
 The Archangel Gabriel, marble, George H. Thacher Monument, St. Agnes Cemetery, Menands, New York, 1896.
 Minute Man, granite, Union Square, Elizabeth, New Jersey, 1905.
 Relief bust of Henry Keney, Keney Park Entrance Gates, Hartford, Connecticut, circa 1905.

Civil War monuments

References
Obituary: Hartford Daily Courant, May 25, 1920.

External links

 Carl H. Conrads from SIRIS.

Artists from Hartford, Connecticut
1839 births
1920 deaths
German emigrants to the United States
Monumental masons
20th-century American sculptors
19th-century American sculptors
American male sculptors
Sculptors from Connecticut
19th-century American male artists
20th-century American male artists